Susanne Zimmer (born 9 June 1960 in Brønderslev) is a Danish politician, who is a member of the Folketing. She was elected in the 2019 Danish general election as a member of The Alternative. She is the co-founder of Independent Greens, though is an independent politician in the Folketing.

Political career
Zimmer was elected into parliament in the 2019 election as a member of The Alternative. In March 2020 S Zimmer and three other members of The Alternative left the party. Zimmer founded the new Independent Greens party with Sikandar Siddique and Uffe Elbæk.

References

External links 
 Biography on the website of the Danish Parliament (Folketinget)

1960 births
Living people
People from Brønderslev
The Alternative (Denmark) politicians
Independent Greens (Denmark) politicians
21st-century Danish women politicians
Women members of the Folketing
Members of the Folketing 2019–2022